Grgić is a Croatian surname, a patronymic derived from the given name Grga or Grgur (Gregory).

It is the most common surname in the Požega-Slavonia County in Croatia, and among the most frequently found surnames in two other counties. Common in Croatia, it is also found in Bosnia and Herzegovina and Serbia. About 7500 people with family name Grgić live in Croatia today, family name Grgić (including: Grgic, Grgich, Gergich, Gergics, Gergick, Ghergich, Gergic and Gergicz) is present in 32 countries worldwide.

Notable people with last name Grgić:
 Berislav Grgić (b. 1960), Norwegian Catholic bishop from Bosnia
 Brent Grgic (b. 1979), Australian footballer 
 Ilija Grgic (b. 1972), Australian Footballer
 Goran Grgić (b. 1965), Croatian actor
 Marko Grgić (b. 1987), Croatian footballer 
 Miljenko Grgić (b. 1923), Croatian-American winemaker 
 Stipe Bačelić-Grgić (b. 1988), Croatian footballer 
 Velimir Grgić (b. 1978), Croatian footballer 
 Zlatko Grgić (1931-1988), Croatian animator

See also
Grgurević, surname

References

Croatian surnames
Patronymic surnames
Surnames from given names